Far sight may refer to:

Hyperopia, farsightedness
Farsight, an audio/video conferencing framework
Farsight Institute, conducts scientific research into remote-viewing
FarSight Studios, an American video game developer
Commander Farsight, or O'Shovah, a Tau character from the fictional Warhammer 40,000 universe. His full name is Shas'O Vior'la Shovah Kais Mont'yr.
Television, derived from mixed Latin and Greek roots, meaning "far sight"